Where's the Truth? is the sixth Korean language studio album by South Korean rock band F.T. Island, released under FNC Entertainment on July 18, 2016. The album is entirely self-produced by the members. The album reached number 5 on the Billboard World Albums chart, making it F.T. Island's highest-charting album up to that point.

The music video for the title song "Take Me Now" was also released on the same day. The song "Take Me Now" is typically dynamic transition feature strong K-pop with the flourishing electronic rock.

Track list

Charts

Weekly charts

References

F.T. Island albums
2015 albums
Korean-language albums
FNC Entertainment albums
Kakao M albums